Guidone is an Italian surname. Notable people with the surname include:

Marco Guidone (born 1986), Italian footballer
Margaretha Guidone (born  1956), Belgian environmentalist

Italian-language surnames